The 1997 All-Ireland Intermediate Hurling Championship was the 14th staging of the All-Ireland hurling championship. The championship ended on 11 October 1997.

Cork won the title after defeating Galway by 2-11 to 1-12 in the final.

Results

Leinster Intermediate Hurling Championship

Quarter-finals

Semi-finals

Final

Munster Intermediate Hurling Championship

Quarter-finals

Semi-finals

Final

All-Ireland Intermediate Hurling Championship

Quarter-final

Semi-final

Final

References

Intermediate
All-Ireland Intermediate Hurling Championship